Donal Murray may refer to;

 Donal Murray (bishop)
 Donal Murray (hurler)